Nycterina may refer to:

 Dracula nycterina, a plant in the family Orchidaceae
 Circbotys nycterina; an insect in the family Pyralidae